Luteostriata ceciliae is a species of Brazilian land planarian in the subfamily Geoplaninae.

Description 
The dorsal color is light-yellow with five dark longitudinal stripes: one median, two paramedian and two lateral. The median stripe is the thinnest and darkest, being well marked and delimited. The paramedian and lateral stripes are broader, but not well marked, being formed by a series of pigment spots and somewhat discontinuous. There are isolated pigment spots between the paramedian and lateral stripes. The anterior end of the body is marked by an orange tinge. The ventral side is yellowish white.

The numerous small eyes occur along the entire body, forming a single row on the body margins in the first millimetres and posteriorly spreading to the dorsum, reaching the lateral stripes.

Distribution 
The only known place of occurrence of L. ceciliae is the São Francisco de Paula National Forest in southern Brazil.

References 

Geoplanidae
Invertebrates of Brazil